Thomas Smith (1746–1823) was a merchant who served as Lord Mayor of London in 1809. Smith was a wineseller on Bridge Street near Blackfriars for many years, and also served as a magistrate after his ascent to the mayoralty. Smith lived between London and Brighton in his last years.

Smith was appointed an alderman in the City of London's Farringdon Within ward in 1802.

Smith was a liveryman of the Worshipful Company of Leathersellers, and served as Master of that Company in 1812–13.

References

1746 births
1823 deaths
Aldermen of the City of London
19th-century lord mayors of London
19th-century English politicians
Sheriffs of the City of London
English merchants
People from Brighton